Yannick Hanfmann was the defending champion but chose not to defend his title.

Filippo Baldi won the title after defeating Gleb Sakharov 6–4, 6–4 in the final.

Seeds

Draw

Finals

Top half

Bottom half

References
Main Draw
Qualifying Draw

Wolffkran Open - Singles
2018 Singles